Contactless smartcards are being progressively introduced to replace paper ticketing on the buses of Britain. The ITSO standard has been developed as a national standard to cover all types of public transport. It is also the format that ENCTS concessionary passes are required to be issued in. The contactless payment function of EMV credit and debit cards is also widely supported across the country.

As of 13 July 2020, the acceptance position is:

See also

 Smartcards on National Rail

References

Fare collection systems in the United Kingdom
Contactless smart cards